Black Magic is an album by Swollen Members, a Canadian hip hop group. It is their fourth full-length release, not including Monsters in the Closet, their B-sides compilation. This album features guest vocals, including former group member Moka Only on two tracks. The album peaked at number 21 on the Billboard Independent Albums chart.

Track listing

Credits

Additional personnel 
 DJ Revolution — Scratches, track 3, 7, 13
 Metty the Dert Merchant — Additional vocals, track 6
 Russ Kine — Guitar, track 6
 Darcy Ladret — Guitar, track 8; bass, track 13
 Fin Manish — Cello, track 10, 15
 Chris Gestrin — Organ, track 10; piano, track 14; synthesizer, track 17
 Bryant Olender — Piano, track 10, 15
 Kytami — Violin, track 10, 15
 DJ Babu — Scratches, track 12
 Jason Rankins — Keyboards — track 13
 Jeff Babko — Organ, track 13
 Kevin Coles — Guitar, track 17
 Keefus — Bass, track 19; piano, track 19; strings, track 19
 Everlast — Guitar, track 19
 DJ Swamp — Scratches, track 20
 Chi Turner — Additional vocals, track 21
 Double Dragon — Additional vocals, track 21; strings, track 21

Additional credits 
 Bernie Grundman — Mastering
 Richard "Segal" Huredia — Mixing
 Roger Swan — Mixing
 Mark Gainor — Art direction
 Chris Allen — Art direction
 Graham Winterbottom — Photography

Charts

References

External links 
 Swollen Members official site
 Battleaxe Records official site

2006 albums
Swollen Members albums
Albums produced by Evidence (musician)
Albums produced by the Alchemist (musician)
Juno Award for Rap Recording of the Year recordings